Croc is a 2000 platform game developed by British studio Virtucraft and published by THQ under license from Fox Interactive and Argonaut Games for the Game Boy Color. It is a remake of the 3D platform game, Croc: Legend of the Gobbos, and features similar gameplay taking place in a 2D environment. The game follows the eponymous character, a crocodile named Croc, as he sets out on a quest to save a race of furry creatures called Gobbos from the evil Baron Dante. The game was released on 6 June 2000 to mixed reviews from critics.

Gameplay
Croc is a 2D side-scrolling platformer in which the player controls a green crocodile named Croc who sets out on a quest to rescue the Gobbos from the evil Baron Dante. The player controls Croc through a series of various short levels, each accessed through a top-down world map. The main goal is to progress through to the end of the stage and hit the gong at the end of the level in order to progress to the next one. At the end of each world, a boss must be defeated in order to progress to the next world. Numerous collectibles are scattered throughout levels, such as blue crystals that act as Croc's health and give the player an extra life when 100 of them are collected, small hearts that also give the player an extra life, and crates containing items that can be broken apart. Each level contains 3 Gobbos, which are hidden throughout the stage in various locations. Also located throughout every stage are 5 multicolored letters spelling out the word "bonus"; collecting all of these letters unlocks a door located at the end of the stage leading to one of several minigames that can be played in order to win a fourth Gobbo, including a slider puzzle, a Whac-a-Mole-esque game, a catching game in which the player moves a bowl back and forth in order to collect various falling items, and a slot machine game. Collecting every single Gobbo in each level before a boss level unlocks a secret level containing a hidden Jigsaw puzzle piece. While collecting all of these pieces is not mandatory for completing the game, doing so unlocks a door in each world that leads to a room where the mini games from the end of the levels, themed after each world, can be played at the player’s leisure.

Croc's moves are very similar to his moves in Croc: Legend of the Gobbos, dawning the ability to walk, climb and swim using the Game Boy Color's directional pad, as well as being able to jump and run using the console's "A" and "B" buttons, respectively. Croc's main methods of attacking consist of swiping his tail in a circular motion, which can be used to defeat enemies and is used to hit the gong at the end of each stage, and a downward hit drop attack that is used to smash open crates containing items. Croc's health is represented by the number of crystals he collects throughout each level; when he is hurt, he loses a small number of crystals. If Croc is hurt while carrying no crystals, he loses a life.

Release
Croc was published by THQ as part of a deal with Fox Interactive to publish the game in tandem, along with several other Game Boy Color games. It later got a sequel called Croc 2 released in 2001.

Reception

Croc received mixed to negative reviews from critics. The game holds an aggregated score of 54% on review website GameRankings.

References

External links 
 Official website (archive)
 

2000 video games
Argonaut Games games
Croc (series)
Fox Interactive games
Game Boy Color games
Game Boy Color-only games
Side-scrolling platform games
Single-player video games
THQ games
Video games developed in the United Kingdom
Video games set on fictional islands
Video game spin-offs